Stefanos Mouhtaris (born 10 July 1994) is a Cypriot footballer who plays for Olympiakos Nicosia.

External links 
 

1994 births
Living people
Cypriot footballers
Cypriot expatriate footballers
Association football defenders
Cyprus under-21 international footballers
Cyprus youth international footballers
Olympiakos Nicosia players
Kallithea F.C. players
Panionios F.C. players
Doxa Katokopias FC players
Cypriot First Division players
Super League Greece players
Football League (Greece) players
Cypriot expatriate sportspeople in Greece
Expatriate footballers in Greece
Sportspeople from Nicosia